PKP Class Pt31 is a Polish steam locomotive of Polskie Koleje Państwowe, designed for hauling heavy long-distance passenger trains, built in 1932-1940. The designation stood for fast passenger (P) 2-8-2 (t) steam locomotive designed in 1931.

The locomotive was entirely Polish design, designed in Fablok in Chrzanów. Polish Ministry of Transport ordered two classes of fast passenger locomotives in Polish factories to compare their merits. Fablok 2-8-2 design was to be named Pt29, but the design was delayed and accepted on in 1931, thus becoming Pt31. Three prototypes were built in 1932 and successfully competed with 4-8-2 Pu29 locomotive - both were similar, but more compact Pt31 better suited Polish turntables. From 1934, a series production for the PKP followed, and by the outbreak of World War II in 1939, 98 were made, numbered Pt31-1 to 98. Further twelve were completed in 1940 under German occupation.

Pt31 became the strongest machines hauling long-distance passenger trains in Poland.

During the war, 54 locomotives were captured by the Germans and impressed into service as DR class 191, with numbers 101 to 154. Further twelve were first designated  as class 3910, finally class 191, with numbers 155 to 166. Remaining 44 Pt31 locomotives were captured by the Soviets in Poland, 21 of them had been converted to broad gauge by 1941, transliterated as ПТ-31 class. A number of Soviet locomotives were captured again by the Germans from 1941, and received German numbers up to 180.

After World War II, Poland reclaimed 65 locomotives, receiving new numbers Pt31-1 to 66 (number 46 was mistakenly assigned to Pu29-3). Before that, they temporarilly served in Czechoslovakia as class 488, Austria, Hungary and both German countries. Three locomotives of wartime production remained on Austrian railways as ÖBB class 919 until 1961, and several broad-gauge remained in the Soviet Union.

These locomotives were used until 1979 in Poland. Only two were preserved, in non-working condition. A post-war development was PKP class Pt47.

References

 

Railway locomotives introduced in 1932
Pt31
2-8-2 locomotives
Fablok locomotives
Standard gauge locomotives of Poland